Abdelrahman Mahmoud (born 1 January 2001) is a Bahraini athlete who competes in the shot put.

Abdelrahman Mahmoud gained his first international experience at the  
2019 Asian Championships in Doha, where he finished fifth with a new national record of 18.68m. At the end of October he started at the World Military Games in Wuhan, but failed to make a valid attempt there. In 2021, he set a new national record in Belarus in mid-January with 19.61 m and improved it the following week to 21.10m, improving the Asian record of Iranian Mehrdelan Shahin from 2020 by 36 centimeters and thus also the qualification standard met for the delayed 2020 Tokyo Olympic Games.

References

External linka
 

2001 births
Living people
Bahraini male shot putters
Athletes (track and field) at the 2020 Summer Olympics
Olympic athletes of Bahrain
21st-century Bahraini people